George Maniakes (transliterated as Georgios Maniaces, Maniakis, or Maniaches,  ; died 1043) was a prominent general of the Byzantine Empire of Byzantine Greek origin                                                               
 during the 11th century. He was the catepan of Italy in 1042. He is known as Gyrgir in Scandinavian sagas. He is popularly said to have been extremely tall and well built, almost a giant.

Biography
Maniakes was a Greek general of the Byzantine Empire who first became prominent during a campaign in 1030–1031, when the Byzantine Empire was defeated at Aleppo but went on to capture Edessa from the Arabs. His greatest achievement was the partial reconquest of Sicily from the Arabs beginning in 1038. Here, he was assisted by the Varangian Guard, which was at that time led by Harald Hardrada, who later became king of Norway.  There were also Norman mercenaries with him, under William de Hauteville, who won his nickname Iron Arm by defeating the emir of Syracuse in single combat. However, he soon ostracized his admiral, Stephen, whose wife was the sister of John the Eunuch, the highest ranking man at court. He then publicly humiliated Arduin, leader of the Lombard contingent, which caused them to desert, along with the Normans and Norsemen. In response, he was recalled by the emperor Michael IV, who was also Stephen's brother-in-law. Although the Arabs soon took the island back, Maniakes' successes there later inspired the Normans to invade Sicily themselves.

The accomplishments of Maniakes in Sicily were largely ignored by the Emperor, and he revolted against Constantine IX in 1042, though he had been appointed catepan of Italy. The individual particularly responsible for antagonizing Maniakes into revolt was one Romanus Sclerus. Sclerus, like Maniakes, was one of the immensely wealthy landowners who owned large areas of Anatolia – his estates neighboured those of Maniakes and the two were rumoured to have attacked each other during a squabble over land. Sclerus owed his influence over the emperor to his famously charming sister Maria Skleraina, who, in most areas was a highly positive influence on Constantine. Finding himself in a position of power, Sclerus used it to poison Constantine against Maniakes – ransacking the latter's house and even seducing his wife, using the charm his family were famed for. Maniakes' response, when faced with Sclerus demanding that he hand command of the empire's forces in Apulia over to him, was to brutally torture the latter to death, after sealing his eyes, ears, nose and mouth with excrement. Maniakes was then proclaimed emperor by his troops (including the Varangians) and marched towards Constantinople. In 1043 his army clashed with troops loyal to Constantine near Thessalonica, and though initially successful, Maniakes was killed during the melee after receiving a fatal wound (according to Psellus' account). Constantine's extravagant punishment of the surviving rebels was to parade them in the Hippodrome, seated backwards on donkeys. With his death, the rebellion ceased. In Sicily, the town of Maniace and the Syracusan fortress of Castello Maniace are both named after him.

References

1043 deaths
Byzantine usurpers
11th-century Byzantine people
11th-century Greek people
11th-century catepans of Italy
Byzantine rebels
Byzantines killed in battle
Byzantine people of the Arab–Byzantine wars
Byzantine Sicily
Year of birth unknown
Medieval Upper Mesopotamia
Protospatharioi